The Indian Institute of Social Welfare & Business Management (IISWBM) is a public business school in Kolkata, India. The school is the first institute in Asia to offer an MBA degree.

It was ranked 34th among management schools by the Business Today' "India's Best B Schools 2014". As per Economic Times B-School Survey, IISWBM was ranked 33rd in Human Resource Management and 37th in Overall Ranking.

History 

In August 2017, Chief Minister Mamata Banerjee suggested IISWBM upgrade to a university. In 2019, alumni association also demanded, university or deemed university status for country's oldest B-school.

Academics

The institute offers the following courses:
 Master of Business Administration (MBA Day) 
 Master of Business Administration (MBA Evening) 
 Master of Business Administration (Human Resource Management)
 Master of Business Administration in Public Systems Management with specialization in Environment Management, Energy Management, Healthcare & Hospital Management, Transportation and Logistics Management 
PhD & M.Phil. (University of Calcutta)
 Executive Post Graduation Programme  in Management (EPGPM)
 Post Graduate Diploma in Sports Management (PGDSM) 

The institute publishes a management Journal called Survey.

Notable people
This list consists of notable people who have been associated with this Institute:

Arindam Sil, Indian Film Star, Director and Producer  
Sumantra Ghoshal, Indian Scholar and Educator

See also 
List of colleges affiliated to the University of Calcutta
Education in India
Education in West Bengal

References

External links

Official website

Business schools in Kolkata
University of Calcutta affiliates
Educational institutions established in 1953
1953 establishments in West Bengal